Flavius Dagalaifus or Dagalaiphus ( 461–475) was a politician of the Eastern Roman Empire.

Son of Areobindus (consul in 434), Dagalaifus married Godisthea, the daughter of Ardabur (consul in 447) and granddaughter of Aspar (consul in 434 and colleague of Areobindus). They had a son, the consul of 506, Areobindus Dagalaifus Areobindus, who married the daughter of the Western Roman Emperor Olybrius.

In 461 he was consul in the East. During the reign of Basiliscus (475-476), Dagalaifus, attested by sources as Patricius, received in his home in Constantinople Daniel the Stylite, to allow him to rest during a demonstration against the Emperor.

References

Bibliography
 

5th-century Byzantine people
5th-century Romans of Gothic descent
5th-century Roman consuls
Gothic warriors
Imperial Roman consuls
Patricii